David Whyte Macdonald CBE FRSE is a Scottish zoologist and conservationist. He is the Director of the Wildlife Conservation Research Unit (WildCRU) at the University of Oxford, which he founded in 1986. He holds a Senior Research Fellowship at Lady Margaret Hall with the Title of Distinction of Professor of Wildlife Conservation. He has been an active wildlife conservationist since graduating from Oxford.

Career
David Macdonald's concept was, and remains, to undertake original research on aspects of fundamental biology relevant to solving practical problems of wildlife conservation and environmental management, and thus to underpin policy formation and public debate of the many issues that surround the conservation of wildlife and its habitats. From his early work on red foxes he retains a specialisation in carnivores, with an increasing emphasis on felids. He has published over 300 papers in refereed international journals, and written or edited more than a dozen books, of which the most recent is Key Topics in Conservation Biology.

Amongst other things he is currently a Visiting Professor at Imperial College, chair of the Darwin Advisory Committee, Chair of Natural England's Science Advisory Committee and board member, a Trustee of Earthwatch Europe and WWF-UK, and council member of the Wildfowl and Wetlands Trust.

He has done much to popularise biology with the general public. He is known for his documentary films and his popular books, for which he has twice won the Natural World Author of the Year award. His Night of the Fox won the BAFTA for Best Documentary Film of 1976, Running with the Fox won the Natural History Book of the Year award for 1987, and Meerkats United won the Wildscreen 1988 award. His films include the popular BBC seven-part series The Velvet Claw, a natural history of carnivores.

Awards and honours
He won the Dawkins Prize for Conservation and Animal Welfare in 2005,  he was awarded the American Society of Mammalogists' Merriam Prize for research in mammalogy in 2006, and in 2007 The Mammal Society of Great Britain's equivalent medal. He was elected a Fellow of the Royal Society of Edinburgh in March 2008.

Macdonald was appointed Commander of the Order of the British Empire (CBE) in the 2010 Birthday Honours.

References

Bibliography

 (Part 2 published 2007)

Living people
Cornell University faculty
Scottish documentary filmmakers
Scottish science writers
Scottish zoologists
Fellows of Lady Margaret Hall, Oxford
Commanders of the Order of the British Empire
Scottish conservationists
Place of birth missing (living people)
Fellows of the Royal Society of Edinburgh
1951 births
Alumni of Wadham College, Oxford
Alumni of Balliol College, Oxford
Conservation biologists